This is a list of earthquakes in 1970. Only magnitude 6.0 or greater earthquakes appear on the list. Lower magnitude events are included if they have caused death, injury or damage. Events which occurred in remote areas will be excluded from the list as they wouldn't have generated significant media interest. All dates are listed according to UTC time. Maximum intensities are indicated on the Mercalli intensity scale and are sourced from United States Geological Survey (USGS) ShakeMap data. In terms of magnitude 7.0+ events this year produced 17 which is average for any year. The death toll however was much higher than preceding years. Three events in particular contributed to this. Firstly, in January, China suffered from an event which caused 10,000 deaths. Then at the end of March, Turkey had a magnitude 6.9 earthquake resulting in over 1,000 deaths. Finally, Peru had its worst disaster on May 31 when an earthquake of magnitude 7.9 helped to cause nearly 67,000 deaths.

Overall

By death toll 

 Note: At least 10 casualties

By magnitude 

 Note: At least 7.0 magnitude

Notable events

January

February

March

April

May

June

July

August

September

October

November

December

References

1970
 
1970